Durley is an unincorporated community in Bond County, Illinois, United States. Durley is northeast of Greenville near Governor Bond Lake.

History
Durley was laid out in the 1880s. The community bears the name of Horatio Durley, a local pioneer. A post office was established at Durley in 1888, and remained in operation until 1903.

References

Unincorporated communities in Bond County, Illinois
Unincorporated communities in Illinois
1888 establishments in Illinois